Petar Petkovski (born 3 January 1997) is a Macedonian professional footballer who plays as a left winger for Liga II club Concordia Chiajna.

Honours
Vardar
1. MFL: 2014–15, 2015–16, 2016–17
Macedonian Super Cup: 2015

References

External links
 

1997 births
Living people
Macedonian footballers
Footballers from Skopje
Macedonian people of Bulgarian descent
North Macedonia youth international footballers
North Macedonia under-21 international footballers
Association football forwards
Liga I players
Liga II players
FC Botoșani players
CS Concordia Chiajna players
FK Vardar players
Macedonian First Football League players
Macedonian expatriate footballers
Expatriate footballers in Romania
Macedonian expatriate sportspeople in Romania